This is the article listing about the broadcasting rights for UEFA Euro 2008. Previously UEFA had sold the rights to the tournament through the European Broadcasting Union (EBU) but for 2008 they worked through the sales agency Sportfive, with which UEFA expected it can increase by more than 600 million the revenue that it can generate.

Financial targets
UEFA hoped to secure 600 million euros from the television rights but initially was reported to be struggling to raise the amount they wanted. In the end, UEFA secured 410 million euros from four of the five biggest markets, Germany, United Kingdom, France and Italy. The broadcasting rights as a whole are reported to have secured UEFA over 30% more than the TV rights to the UEFA Euro 2004 championship.

UEFA and free-to-air television
UEFA kept a policy that each country should be able to watch their own team on free-to-air television. However, UEFA was unhappy that the list of events that must be shown on terrestrial television in the United Kingdom included all of the matches in the tournament even though none of the home nations qualified for the event. Only in the United Kingdom and Belgium were pay television unable to bid for any of the live broadcasting rights. UEFA is bringing a legal case with the European Union as it saw this as infringing their property rights and distorted competition.

Broadcasters

UEFA

Rest of the world

References

Broadcasting rights
2008